Kenneth Norman Ernest Newell, OBE, is a retired Irish Presbyterian minister. He served as Moderator of the General Assembly of the Presbyterian Church in Ireland (June 2004 – 2005), and was the minister of Fitzroy Presbyterian Church, until his retirement on 21 September 2008.

Biography
Newell was born in Belfast in 1942, just after the Blitz. In 1976, at the height of the Troubles,  he returned to Belfast from a teaching post on the island of Timor in Indonesia.

He served as Moderator of the General Assembly of the Presbyterian Church in Ireland (June 2004 – 2005), and was the minister of Fitzroy Presbyterian Church until his retirement on 21 September 2008.

His time as a minister was marked by a commitment to peacemaking, and he was responsible for building relationships in communities in Belfast.

Books
 Captured by a Vision (2016) Colourpoint Books,

References

Living people
Presbyterian ministers from Northern Ireland
Moderators of the Presbyterian Church in Ireland
Officers of the Order of the British Empire
1942 births